The Bazighiyya Shia (named for Bazigh ibn Yunus, to whom they were related) was a Ghulat sect of Shia Islam. They believed that Ja’far ibn Muhammad al-Sādiq was God. Today, descendants of the followers of the sect either converted to Shia Islam or mainstream Twelver Shia Islam.

Beliefs
The Bazighiyya Shia had the following beliefs:
They believed the Imams after Muhammad are (in chronological order):
Ali, then
Hasan ibn Ali, then
Husayn ibn Ali, then
Alī ibn Ḥusayn Zayn al-Abidin, then
Muḥammad ibn ‘Alī al-Baqir
They believed that Ja'far al-Sadiq (who succeeded his father Muhammad al-Baqir) was not an Imam, but God Himself.
They believed Ja'far al-Sadiq commands the Bazighiyya Shi’ites the acts of the inhabitants of heaven.
They believed God does not look like Ja'far al-Sadiq, but He merely presents Himself to the people in Ja'far's form.
They believed the Imams after Ja'far al-Sadiq, like the Imams before him, are not gods.
They believed that everything that is born in their hearts is revelation.
They believed that every Bazighiyya Shi’ite receives revelation. To support their belief they used as evidence the words of God in the Qur’an:
“Nor can a soul die except by the leave of God” and
“And your Lord inspired the bee” and
“And behold, I inspired the disciples to have faith in Me.”
They believed there are among them some who are better than the angels Gabriel and Michael, and the prophets Abraham and Muhammad.
They believed that no Bazighiyya Shi’ite will die. Rather, when one of them reaches perfection in his devotion, he is taken up to the heavenly kingdom.
They believed they have seen those of them that are deceased, and that they see them in the morning and evening.

See also
Islamic schools and branches
List of extinct Shia sects

References

Further reading
An Ismaili heresiography: the "Bāb al-shayṭān" from Abū Tammām's Kitāb al ..., By Wilferd Madelung, Paul Ernest Walker, pg.104

Shia Islamic branches
Ghulat sects